Black is a 2022 Indian Telugu-language crime action thriller film written and directed by GB Krishna and produced by Mahankali Diwakar for Mahankali Movies. The film features Aadi Sai Kumar and Darshana Banik in lead roles with Kaushal Manda, Aamani, Prudhvi Raj and Thagubothu Ramesh in pivotal roles. Songs and background score are composed by Suresh Bobbili.

Plot 
Aditya and Arjun are twins, Aditya becomes a policeman as per his father's wish. Arjun is attracted to Radhaki and falls in love with her. Meanwhile, Arjun accidentally gets involved in a mysterious robbery and murder case. As the investigation takes a new turn with the entry of the new boss Vihan Varma Sub- Inspector of Police, Adithya finds out shocking secrets related to his past.

Cast 
 Aadi Saikumar as Aditya / Arjun
 Darshana Banik as Haanika 
 Kaushal Manda as Vihan Varma
 Aamani as Aditya's Mother
 Prudhvi Raj 
 Thagubothu Ramesh 
 Satyam Rajesh

Soundtrack 

Music composed by Suresh Bobbili

Release
The film was released on 28 May 2022.

Critical reception 
The film received 2.75 stars out of five in a review by The Times of India and 2 out of 5 stars by 123telugu.

References

External links
 

2020s Telugu-language films
2022 action films
Indian action films
Indian crime action films